Super Swing Golf (PangYa! Golf With Style in Europe, and Swing Golf PangYa in Japan) is a Wii version of the online golf game, PangYa. The game was a launch title for the Wii in Japan.

Gameplay
While very similar to the online PangYa, Super Swing Golf is slightly different in the areas of control and content. Both the single player and multiplayer game feature three different modes of play. In single player, these include a story mode, stroke play mode, and match mode, while in multiplayer, Balloon Pop mode replaces the story mode. In all modes, Pang (currency) can be earned and later spent on additional clothing or gear.

Players use the Wii Remote to scroll and pan around the course, as well as to actually execute shots. To swing, players raise the controller behind them (as with a real golf club) until the on-screen power meter reaches the desired point. Once ready, players then hold down the "A" button and swing forward. The angle and speed of the forward swing is used to determine how close the actual shot comes to the desired shot. If the controller is rotated or twisted as the player swings forward, the resulting shot will hook or slice. An alternative control system is to use just the buttons on the Wii Remote similar to how the game is played on the PC, including the same key combinations for power shots.

The Wii single-player story mode is named PangYa Festa. Complete with an anime-inspired storyline, the objective of this tournament is to defeat all opponents in match play. Players select a character and then a course, which determines the number of holes, typically 3, 6 or 9, and the opponent. As players successfully defeat opponents, they earn the right to play against more difficult opponents on different courses. Winning a given match also unlocks new characters, caddies, and items which can be purchased in the shop. Before and after each match, the player is greeted with a brief cutscene where the player's character and opponent exchange quips with each other and their caddies.

Reception

The game was met with positive reception. IGN gave it a score of 7.3 out of 10, calling it a fair game with a lot of replay value, but ultimately the rest depended on preference. Yahoo! Games awarded it 4.5/5, saying it was a fun mix between silly swings and serious golf. X-Play gave it four stars out of five for being fun but very difficult in some areas. GameRankings gave the game a score of 71.40%, while Metacritic gave it 72 out of 100.

Sequel
A sequel, Super Swing Golf: Season 2, was released on December 11, 2007.

References

External links
Official Japanese Super Swing Pangya Golf site

2006 video games
Golf video games
Tecmo games
Video games developed in Japan
Wii-only games
Wii games
Multiplayer and single-player video games